South Surrey—White Rock is a federal electoral district in British Columbia, Canada, that has been represented in the House of Commons of Canada since 2015. It encompass a portion of British Columbia previously included in the electoral districts of Fleetwood—Port Kells, Newton—North Delta, and South Surrey—White Rock—Cloverdale.

South Surrey—White Rock was created by the 2012 federal electoral boundaries redistribution and was legally defined in the 2013 representation order. It came into effect upon the call of the 42nd Canadian federal election, on October 19, 2015.

The 2017 by-election was won by Liberal candidate and former White Rock mayor Gordie Hogg. However, the Conservatives were quick to regain their seat with Kerry-Lynne Findlay winning the 43nd Canadian federal election, defeating Gordie Hogg who entered Parliament through a by-election.

Demographics

According to the Canada 2011 Census

Religions: 52.1% Christian, 4.3% Sikh, 1.4% Buddhist, 1.1% Muslim, 2.0% Other, 39.1% None. 
Median income: $34,974 (2010) 
Average income: $50,826 (2010)

Members of Parliament
This riding has elected the following members of the House of Commons of Canada:

Election results

On November 5, 2017, Prime Minister Justin Trudeau announced a by-election which was held on December 11, 2017.

Notes

References

British Columbia federal electoral districts
Federal electoral districts in Greater Vancouver and the Fraser Valley
Politics of Surrey, British Columbia
White Rock, British Columbia